The M&B Railroad , formerly the Meridian and Bigbee Railroad, is a Class III railroad that operates 189 miles of railroad from Meridian, Mississippi eastward to Burkville, Alabama. Additionally, the M&B has trackage rights over CSX from Burkeville to Montgomery, Alabama. MNBR operates with 286,000-pound railcar loading capacity.

History
The M&B was chartered on December 24, 1926. Construction advanced eastward to Cromwell, Alabama in April 1928, and finally to Myrtlewood, Alabama where it connected with the L&N in 1935. The railroad operated with steam locomotives until 1953. Today, engine #116, a 2-8-0 Consolidation built by the Baldwin Locomotive Works in 1917 originally for the Susquehanna and New York Railroad is the only surviving M&B steam locomotive left. It is currently on display at Highland Park in Meridian.

In 2003 the M&B took over the ex-L&N line from Myrtlewood to Selma, Alabama and the ex-Western Railway of Alabama line from Selma to Burkville. CSX retained ownership between Montgomery and Burkville, where there is a large industrial customer.

In 2005, Genesee & Wyoming Inc. acquired MNBR.

In 2007, the line gained publicity when a train hauling parts of the Space Shuttle solid rocket booster derailed on an overloaded bridge weakened by heavy rains.

Between 2018-2022, more than $21 million of investments were made in MNBR, including improvements at Naheola Yard and Meridian Yard. The Meridian Yard improvements were the result of a public-private partnership between Mississippi Department of Transportation and MNBR. During that period, more than 99,000 new crossties and switch ties were installed. More than $7 million was invested to improve grade crossings and to repair and upgrade bridges along the line.

References

External links
Meridian and Bigbee Railroad official webpage - Genesee and Wyoming website

Alabama railroads
Mississippi railroads
Genesee & Wyoming